Linda Stone (born 1955) is a writer and consultant who coined the phrase "continuous partial attention" in 1998. Stone also coined "email apnea" in 2008 which means "a temporary absence or suspension of breathing, or shallow breathing, while doing email."

Stone was at Apple Computer from 1986 to 1993, working on multimedia hardware, software and publishing. In her last year at Apple, Stone worked for CEO John Sculley on special projects. In 1993, Stone joined Microsoft Research under Nathan Myhrvold and Rick Rashid. She co-founded and directed the Virtual Worlds Group/Social Computing Group, researching online social life and virtual communities. During this time, she also taught as adjunct faculty in New York University's Interactive Telecommunications Program. In 2000, she became a Microsoft vice president, working on industry relationships and improving Microsoft's corporate culture. She left Microsoft in 2002.

Stone served a six-year term on the National Board of the World Wildlife Fund and is currently on the WWF National Council. She is an adviser for the Internet and American Life Project, the Hidden Brain Drain Task Force for the Center for Worklife Policy, and is on the Advisory Board of the MIT Media Lab for social computing.  Stone has been written about in many major publications, including Wired, the New York Times, and Forbes.

She conceived Science Foo Camp, a series of interdisciplinary scientific conferences organized by O'Reilly Media and Nature Publishing Group.

References

Further reading

External links 

 Linda Stone's home page

1955 births
Living people
American consultants
American technology writers
Microsoft employees
Apple Inc. employees
New York University faculty